Gerardo Horacio Porcayo Villalobos (born May 10, 1966 in Cuernavaca, Morelos, Mexico) is a Mexican science fiction and fantasy writer.  
Porcayo's novel, La primera calle de la soledad (Solitude's First Road) is considered to be the first example of the cyberpunk subgenre of science fiction in Iberoamerican literature.  
He currently works at the Universidad Iberoamericana Puebla.

See also
List of people from Morelos, Mexico

References

Mexican science fiction writers
1966 births
Living people
Mexican fantasy writers
Writers from Morelos
People from Cuernavaca